Phu Bai International Airport  is located just south of the central city of Huế, former capital of Vietnam.

News 

October 30, 2005: Phú Bài Airport officially welcomed its first international flight since it was allowed to receive international flights by Vietnamese government in 2002. The charter flight operated by Austrian Airlines carried Austrian tourists from Luang Prabang, Laos.
On May 24, 2007: Changi Airports International (CAI) today announced that it has signed a Memorandum of Understanding (MOU) with the People's Committee of Thua Thien Hue Province for the development of Phu Bai–Hue International Airport. This MOU was signed as part of the Vietnamese government's launch of a tourism master plan to develop Thua Thien Hue Province as the next international tourism destination of Vietnam.

The MOU was signed by Mr. Nguyen Xuan Ly, Chairman of People's Committee of Thua Thien Hue Province and Mr. Chow Kok Fong, Chief Executive Officer of CAI in Vietnam. The event was witnessed by officials from the Civil Aviation Administration of Vietnam (CAAV).

February 23, 2013: Phú Bài Airport was expected to close for eight months for runway repairs and upgrades, estimated between 500 and 600 billion Vietnam Dong. The airport was actually closed from March 20 to September 20, two months less than planned. During this period, tourists who wished to travel to Hue by air had to use Da Nang International Airport.

A new terminal invested by The Airports Corporation of Vietnam with total investment of about VNĐ2.250 trillion (US$96.9 million) will cover about 10,118sq.m and have capacity of five million passengers per year by 2020 and up to 6.5-7 million passengers by 2025. This terminal is scheduled to be finished by the end of 2021.

Airlines and destinations

See also 

 List of airports in Vietnam

References

Airports in Vietnam
Huế
Buildings and structures in Thừa Thiên Huế province